Angelo Ciccone (born 7 July 1980) is an Italian amateur road and track cyclist. He has claimed four Italian national championship titles in track cycling (omnium, madison, and points race), and later represented his nation Italy in two editions of the Olympic Games (2004 and 2008). Ciccone currently races for the 2013 season with Cycling Team Friuli under his head coach Roberto Bressan.

Ciccone competed at the 2004 Summer Olympics in Athens, where he scored a total of forty-nine points (the victor got ninety-three) to grab the eighth spot in the men's points race. In that same year, Ciccone also claimed a silver medal in men's omnium at the European Championships in Valencia, Spain, and eventually collected his first two Italian national championship titles in both team pursuit and madison.

At the 2008 Summer Olympics in Beijing, Ciccone qualified for his second Italian squad, as a 28-year-old, in two track cycling events by receiving an automatic berth from UCI based on his top-ten performance in the Track World Rankings. In the men's points race, held on the second day of the program, Ciccone picked up a total of eight points without receiving an extra lap to score a thirteenth place in a 25-km, 10-lap sprint race. Teaming with Fabio Masotti in men's Madison three days later, Ciccone started out a 50 km, sixteen-sprint race for the Italian duo by taking the lap first over the entire field, but did not receive a single point and lost three laps in all sprints, dropping him and his partner off to fourteenth place.

Four years later, at the 2012 European Championships in Panevėžys, Lithuania, Ciccone and his new partner Elia Viviani scored twenty points to end his eight-year medal drought with a bronze in men's Madison, finishing ahead of Swiss duo Tristan Marguet and Silvan Dilier by a three-point margin.

Career highlights

2003
 1st Coppa San Geo, Italy
 1st Poreč Trophy, Croatia
  European Championships (Omnium), Moscow (RUS)
2004
 1st  Italian Track Cycling Championships (Madison with Fabio Masotti), Pordenone (ITA)
 1st  Italian Track Cycling Championships (Team pursuit), Pordenone (ITA)
 2nd Italian Track Cycling Championships (Points race), Pordenone (ITA)
  European Championships (Omnium), Valencia (ESP)
 8th Olympic Games (Points race), Athens (GRE)
2005
 1st Stage 8, Volta de Ciclismo Internacional do Estado de São Paulo, Campinas (BRA)
 2nd Italian Track Cycling Championships (Points race), San Vincenzo (ITA)
 3rd Coppa San Vito, Italy
 3rd Stage 5, Volta de Ciclismo Internacional do Estado de São Paulo, Bauru (BRA)
 3rd Stage 7, Volta de Ciclismo Internacional do Estado de São Paulo, Ribeirão Preto (BRA)
2007
 1st  Italian Track Cycling Championships (Madison with Fabio Masotti), Dalmine (ITA)
 2nd Italian Track Cycling Championships (Derny), Dalmine (ITA)
  Athens Open Balkan Championships (Points race), Athens (ESP)
 3rd Italian Track Cycling Championships (Scratch), Dalmine (ITA)
2008
 3rd Prologue, Tour of Romania, Romania
 13th Olympic Games (Points race), Beijing (CHN)
 14th Olympic Games (Madison with Fabio Masotti), Beijing (CHN)
2009
 1st Stage 3, Tour of Romania, Botoșani (ROU)
 4th Stage 1, Giro del Friuli, Ronchi dei Legionari (ITA)
 5th Prologue, Tour of Romania, Constanța (ROU)
2010
 1st Prologue, Tour of Romania, Deva (ROU)
  Stage 4, UCI World Cup (Madison with Elia Viviani), Beijing (CHN)
 6th European Championships (Madison with Fabio Masotti), Pruszków (POL)
 7th UCI World Championships (Madison), Copenhagen (DEN)
 11th UCI World Championships (Team pursuit), Copenhagen (DEN)
 14th UCI World Championships (Points race), Copenhagen (DEN)
2011
 2nd Italian Track Cycling Championships (Points race), Italy
 2nd Italian Track Cycling Championships (Madison), Italy
 3rd Memorijal Nevio Valčić, Croatia
 3rd Overall, Tour of Romania, Romania
2012
 1st  Italian Track Cycling Championships (Omnium), Pordenone (ITA)
  European Championships (Madison with Elia Viviani), Panevėžys (LTU)
 4th Poreč Trophy, Croatia
 6th UCI World Championships (Points race), Melbourne (AUS)
2013
 4th UCI World Championships (Madison), Minsk (BLR)
 8th UCI World Championships (Points race), Minsk (BLR)

References

External links
NBC Olympics Profile

1980 births
Living people
Italian track cyclists
Italian male cyclists
Cyclists at the 2004 Summer Olympics
Cyclists at the 2008 Summer Olympics
Olympic cyclists of Italy
Sportspeople from the Province of Ferrara
Cyclists from Emilia-Romagna